Budyně nad Ohří is a town in Litoměřice District in the Ústí nad Labem Region of the Czech Republic. It has about 2,100 inhabitants. It lies on the Ohře river. The town centre is well preserved and is protected by law as an urban monument zone.

Administrative parts

Villages of Břežany nad Ohří, Kostelec nad Ohří, Nížebohy, Písty, Roudníček and Vrbka are administrative parts of Budyně nad Ohří.

Geography
It lies in a flat and mainly agricultural landscape of the Lower Eger Table. It lies on the Ohře river.

History
The first written mention of Budyně nad Ohří is from 1173. Originally there was a wooden castle, but it was rebuilt to a Gothic stone castle by Ottokar I of Bohemia at the beginning of the 13th century. King John of Bohemia sold Budyně to the noble family Zajíc of Hazmburk, who owned it until 1613. During their rule, the castle and the whole estate prospered and developed.

Sights

Budyně nad Ohří is known for its water castle. Since 1946, it has been owned by the town. In the 1920s, the Janda's Museum was founded in the premises of the castle with an exposition of donations from travellers and private collections of the inhabitants of the region. The museum was reopened in 1997.

Notable people
Bavor Rodovský mladší of Hustířany (1526–1591), nobleman and alchemist; died here
Petr Čech (born 1944), hurdler

Twin towns – sister cities

Budyně nad Ohří is twinned with:
 Hohnstein, Germany

References

External links

Cities and towns in the Czech Republic
Populated places in Litoměřice District